Justin Murphy may refer to

Justin Murphy (comics), creator of comics and graphic novels
Justin Murphy (rugby league), Australian rugby league footballer
Justin Murphy (Australian rules footballer), Australian rules footballer